The Dundubiini are a tribe of cicadas in the family Cicadidae, found in the Palearctic, Indomalaya, Australasia, and the Western Pacific. There are at least 180 described species in Dundubiini.

Subtribes and Genera
The Dmitriev species file includes:
Aolina Boulard, 2013
 Biura Lee & Sanborn, 2015 c g
 Haphsa Distant, 1905
 Kaphsa Lee, 2012
 Khimbya Distant, 1905
 Meimuna Distant, 1905
 Sinapsaltria Kato, 1940
 Sinosemia Matsumura, 1927
 Sinotympana Lee, 2009 c g
 Zaphsa Lee & Emery, 2014 c g
Dundubiina Distant, 1905
 Champaka Distant, 1905 c g
 Changa Lee, 2016 c g
 Crassopsaltria Boulard, 2008 c g
 Dundubia Amyot & Serville, 1843 c g - type genus
 Lethama Distant, 1905
 Macrosemia Kato, 1925 c g
 Minilomia Lee, 2013
 Platylomia Stål, 1870 c g
 Songga Lee, 2016 c g
Megapomponiina Lee, 2014
 Megapomponia Boulard, 2005 c g
 Unipomponia Lee, 2014 c g
Orientopsaltriina Lee, 2014
 Ayesha Distant, 1905 c g
 Orientopsaltria Kato, 1944 c g
incertae sedis
 Cochleopsaltria Pham & Constant, 2018
 † Tymocicada Becker-Migdisova, 1954

Data sources: i = ITIS, c = Catalogue of Life, g = GBIF, b = Bugguide.net

References

 
Cicadinae
Hemiptera tribes
Taxa named by Edwin Felix Thomas Atkinson